There are more than 650 Jawahar Navodaya Vidyalaya schools in India. These JNVs are governed by eight different regions. These Regional Offices are at Bhopal, Chandigarh, Hyderabad, Jaipur, Lucknow, Patna, Pune and Shillong which have jurisdiction over different states and union territories of India. The list of various Jawahar Navodaya Vidyalayas in India listed regionally, including states:

Bhopal Region 
There are a total of 113 JNVs in Bhopal Region. The state-wise list is follows:

Chhattisgarh 
 Jawahar Navodaya Vidyalaya, Raigarh
 Jawahar Navodaya Vidyalaya, Basdeif
 Jawahar Navodaya Vidyalaya, Dantewada
 Jawahar Navodaya Vidyalaya, Dhamtari
 Jawahar Navodaya Vidyalaya, Durg
 Jawahar Navodaya Vidyalaya, Jashpur
 Jawahar Navodaya Vidyalaya, Kanker
 Jawahar Navodaya Vidyalaya, Korba
 Jawahar Navodaya Vidyalaya, Koriya
 Jawahar Navodaya Vidyalaya, Mungeli

Madhya Pradesh 
 Jawahar Navodaya Vidyalaya, vidisha
 Jawahar Navodaya Vidyalaya, Ashok Nagar
 Jawahar Navodaya Vidyalaya, Betul
 Jawahar Navodaya Vidyalaya, Bohani
 Jawahar Navodaya Vidyalaya, Hatta
 Jawahar Navodaya vidyalaya, Jabalpur
 Jawahar Navodaya Vidyalaya, Indore
 Jawahar Navodaya Vidyalaya, Khurai
Jawahar Navodaya Vidyalaya, Mandsaur
 Jawahar Navodaya Vidyalaya, Rampura
 Jawahar Navodaya Vidyalaya, Shyampur
 Jawahar Navodaya Vidyalaya, Seoni
 Jawahar Navodaya Vidyalaya, Ratlam
Jawahar Navodaya Vidyalaya, Amarkantak

Odisha 
 Jawahar Navodaya Vidyalaya, Khurdha
 Jawahar Navodaya Vidyalaya, Hadgarh
 Jawahar Navodaya Vidyalaya, Bagudi
 Jawahar Navodaya Vidyalaya, Belpada, Balangir
 Jawahar Navodaya Vidyalaya, Mundali
 Jawahar Navodaya Vidyalaya, Narla, Kalahandi
 Jawahar Navodaya Vidyalaya, Rayagada
 Jawahar Navodaya Vidyalaya, Sambalpur
 Jawahar Navodaya Vidyalaya, Sundargarh
 Jawahar Navodaya Vidyalaya, Jharsuguda

Chandigarh Region 
There are a total of 59 JNVs in Chandigarh Region. The state-wise list is follows:

Chandigarh 
 Jawahar Navodaya Vidyalaya, Chandigarh

Himachal Pradesh 
 Jawahar Navodaya Vidyalaya, Bilaspur
 Jawahar Navodaya Vidyalaya, Dungrin
 Jawahar Navodaya Vidyalaya, Kaza Lahul Spiti
 Jawahar Navodaya Vidyalaya, Kinnaur
 Jawahar Navodaya Vidyalaya, Kullu
 Jawahar Navodaya Vidyalaya, Mandi
 Jawahar Navodaya Vidyalaya, Kangra
 Jawahar Navodaya Vidyalaya, Una
 Jawahar Navodaya Vidyalaya, Sirmaur
 Jawahar Navodaya Vidyalaya, Solan
 Jawahar Navodaya Vidyalaya, Theog

Jammu and Kashmir 
 Jawahar Navodaya Vidyalaya, Shopian
 Jawahar Navodaya Vidyalaya Bandipora
 Jawahar Navodaya Vidyalaya, Kupwara
 Jawahar Navodaya Vidyalaya, Anantnag
 Jawahar Navodaya Vidyalaya, Baramulla
 Jawahar Navodaya Vidyalaya, Basohli
 Jawahar Navodaya Vidyalaya, Doda
 Jawahar Navodaya Vidyalaya, Ganderbal
 Jawahar Navodaya Vidyalaya, Gharota
 Jawahar Navodaya Vidyalaya, Budgam
 Jawahar Navodaya Vidyalaya, Rajouri
 Jawahar Navodaya Vidyalaya, Kulgam
 Jawahar Navodaya Vidyalaya, Nud
 Jawahar Navodaya Vidyalaya, Surankote
 Jawahar Navodaya Vidyalaya, Udhampur
 Jawahar Navodaya Vidyalaya, Pulwama

Ladakh 

 Jawahar Navodaya Vidyalaya, Leh
 Jawahar Navodaya Vidyalaya, Kargil

Punjab 
 Jawahar Navodaya Vidyalaya, Awan, Amritsar I
 Jawahar Navodaya Vidyalaya, Bathinda
 Jawahar Navodaya Vidyalaya, Bring Khera
 Jawahar Navodaya Vidyalaya, kauni, Faridkot
 Jawahar Navodaya Vidyalaya, Farour, Fatehgarh Sahib
 Jawahar Navodaya Vidyalaya, Ferozepur
 Jawahar Navodaya Vidyalaya, Najochak, Pathankot
 Jawahar Navodaya Vidyalaya, phalahi Hoshiarpur
 Jawahar Navodaya Vidyalaya,Talwandi madho, Jalandhar
 Jawahar Navodaya Vidyalaya, maseetan, Kapurthala
 Jawahar Navodaya Vidyalaya, Lohara, Moga
 Jawahar Navodaya Vidyalaya, Dhanansu,Ludhiana
 Jawahar Navodaya Vidyalaya, Mansa
 Jawahar Navodaya Vidyalaya, Patiala
 Jawahar Navodaya Vidyalaya, Sandhuan, Ropar
 Jawahar Navodaya Vidyalaya, Longowal, Sangrur
 Jawahar Navodaya Vidyalaya,pojewal SBS Nagar,
 Jawahar Navodaya vidyalaya, Mohali
 Jawahar Navodaya vidyalaya, lopoke, Amritsar-II
 Jawahar Navodaya vidyalaya, Dhilwan, Barnala

Hyderabad Region 
There are a total of 77 JNVs in Hyderabad Region. The state-wise list of JNVs is follows

Andaman and Nicobar Islands 
 Jawahar Navodaya Vidyalaya, Middle Andaman
 Jawahar Navodaya Vidyalaya, Car Nicobar
 Jawahar Navodaya Vidyalaya, South Andaman

Andhra Pradesh 
 Jawahar Navodaya Vidyalaya, Anantpur, HINDUPURAM
 Jawahar Navodaya Vidyalaya, East Godavari-2
 Jawahar Navodaya Vidyalaya, Guntur
 Jawahar Navodaya Vidyalaya, Kadapa
 Jawahar Navodaya Vidyalaya, Prakasam
 Jawahar Navodaya Vidyalaya, Peddapuram
 Jawahar Navodaya Vidyalaya, Valasapalle
 Jawahar Navodaya Vidyalaya, Veleru
 Jawahar Navodaya Vidyalaya, West Godavari
 Jawahar Navodaya Vidyalaya, Vizianagaram
 Jawahar Navodaya Vidyalaya, Visakhapatnam

Karnataka 
 Jawahar Navodaya Vidyalaya, Bagalkote
 Jawahar Navodaya Vidyalaya, Bangalore Rural
 Jawahar Navodaya Vidyalaya, Bangalore Urban
 Jawahar Navodaya Vidyalaya, Belagavi
 Jawahar Navodaya Vidyalaya, Bellary
 Jawahar Navodaya Vidyalaya, Bidar
 Jawahar Navodaya Vidyalaya, Bijapur
 Jawahar Navodaya Vidyalaya, Chamrajnagar
 Jawahar Navodaya Vidyalaya, Chickmagalur
 Jawahar Navodaya Vidyalaya, Chikkaballapura
 Jawahar Navodaya Vidyalaya, Chitradurga
 Jawahar Navodaya Vidyalaya, Dakshina Kannada
 Jawahar Navodaya Vidyalaya, Davangare
 Jawahar Navodaya Vidyalaya, Dharwad
 Jawahar Navodaya Vidyalaya, Gadag
 Jawahar Navodaya Vidyalaya, Hassan
 Jawahar Navodaya Vidyalaya, Haveri
 Jawahar Navodaya Vidyalaya, Kalaburagi - I
 Jawahar Navodaya Vidyalaya, Kalaburagi - II
 Jawahar Navodaya Vidyalaya, Kodagu
 Jawahar Navodaya Vidyalaya, Kolar
 Jawahar Navodaya Vidyalaya, Koppal
 Jawahar Navodaya Vidyalaya, Mandya
 Jawahar Navodaya Vidyalaya, Mysuru
 Jawahar Navodaya Vidyalaya, Raichur
 Jawahar Navodaya Vidyalaya, Ramanagara
 Jawahar Navodaya Vidyalaya, Shimoga
 Jawahar Navodaya Vidyalaya, Tumkur
 Jawahar Navodaya Vidyalaya, Udupi
 Jawahar Navodaya Vidyalaya, Uttara Kannada
 Jawahar Navodaya Vidyalaya, Yadgiri

Kerala 
 Jawahar Navodaya Vidyalaya, Alappuzha
 Jawahar Navodaya Vidyalaya, Chendayadu
 Jawahar Navodaya Vidyalaya, Ernakulam
 Jawahar Navodaya Vidyalaya, Idukki
 Jawahar Navodaya Vidyalaya, Kasaragod
 Jawahar Navodaya Vidyalaya, Kollam
 Jawahar Navodaya Vidyalaya, Kottayam
 Jawahar Navodaya Vidyalaya, Kozhikode
 Jawahar Navodaya Vidyalaya, Malappuram
 Jawahar Navodaya Vidyalaya, Palakkad
 Jawahar Navodaya Vidyalaya, Pathanamthitta
 Jawahar Navodaya Vidyalaya, Thiruvananthapuram
 Jawahar Navodaya Vidyalaya, Thrissur
 Jawahar Navodaya Vidyalaya, Wayanad

Lakshadweep 
 Jawahar Navodaya Vidyalaya, Minicoy

Puducherry 
 Jawahar Navodaya Vidyalaya, Karaikal
 Jawahar Navodaya Vidyalaya, Mahe
 Jawahar Navodaya Vidyalaya, Puducherry
 Jawahar Navodaya Vidyalaya, Yanam

Telangana 
 Jawahar Navodaya Vidyalaya, Adilabad
 Jawahar Navodaya Vidyalaya, Karimnagar
 Jawahar Navodaya Vidyalaya, Khammam
 Jawahar Navodaya Vidyalaya, Mahabubnagar
 Jawahar Navodaya Vidyalaya, Medak
 Jawahar Navodaya Vidyalaya, Nalgonda
 Jawahar Navodaya Vidyalaya, Nizamabad
 Jawahar Navodaya Vidyalaya, Ranga Reddy
 Jawahar Navodaya Vidyalaya, Warangal

Jaipur Region 
There are a total of 65 JNVs in Jaipur Region. The state-wise list is follows:

Delhi 
 Jawahar Navodaya Vidyalaya, Mungeshpur
 Jawahar Navodaya Vidyalaya, Jaffarpur Kalan

Haryana 
 Jawahar Navodaya Vidyalaya, Ambala
 Jawahar Navodaya Vidyalaya, Bhiwani
 Jawahar Navodaya Vidyalaya, Faridabad
 Jawahar Navodaya Vidyalaya, Fatehabad
 Jawahar Navodaya Vidyalaya, Gurgaon
 Jawahar Navodaya Vidyalaya, Hisar
 Jawahar Navodaya Vidyalaya, Jhajjar
 Jawahar Navodaya Vidyalaya, Jind
 Jawahar Navodaya Vidyalaya, Kaithal
 Jawahar Navodaya Vidyalaya, Karnal
 Jawahar Navodaya Vidyalaya, Kurukshetra
 Jawahar Navodaya Vidyalaya, Mahendragarh
 Jawahar Navodaya Vidyalaya, Mewat
 Jawahar Navodaya Vidyalaya, Palwal
 Jawahar Navodaya Vidyalaya, Panchkula
 Jawahar Navodaya Vidyalaya, Panipat
 Jawahar Navodaya Vidyalaya, Rewari

Rajasthan 
 Jawahar Navodaya Vidyalaya, Jaipur
 Jawahar Navodaya Vidyalaya, Karauli
 Jawahar Navodaya Vidyalaya, Churu
 Jawahar Navodaya Vidyalaya, Jaswantpura
 Jawahar Navodaya Vidyalaya, Jojawar
 Jawahar Navodaya Vidyalaya, Mandaphia
 Jawahar Navodaya Vidyalaya, Patan
 Jawahar Navodaya Vidyalaya, Nagaur
 Jawahar Navodaya Vidyalaya, Atru (Baran)
 Jawahar Navodaya Vidyalaya, Kherabad (Kota)
 Jawahar Navodaya Vidyalaya, Pachpahar (Jhalawar)

Lucknow region 
There are a total of 89 JNVs in Lucknow Region. The state-wise list is follows:

Uttar Pradesh
 Jawahar Navodaya Vidyalaya, Raebareli
Jawahar Navodaya Vidyalaya, Gorakhpur
 Jawahar Navodaya Vidyalaya, Kushinagar
 Jawahar Navodaya Vidyalaya, Deoria
 Jawahar Navodaya Vidyalaya, Ballia
 Jawahar Navodaya Vidyalaya, Bhogaon
 Jawahar Navodaya Vidyalaya, Mirzapur
 Jawahar Navodaya Vidyalaya, Sitapur
 Jawahar Navodaya Vidyalaya, Barabanki
 Jawahar Navodaya Vidyalaya, Saharanpur
 Jawahar Navodaya Vidyalaya, Sonbhadra
 Jawahar Navodaya Vidyalaya, Sultanpur
 Jawahar Navodaya Vidyalaya, Chandauli
 Jawahar Navodaya Vidyalaya, Bareilly
Jawahar Navodaya Vidyalaya, Anaugi Kannauj
Jawahar Navodaya Vidyalaya, Jhansi
Jawahar Navodaya Vidyalaya, Jaunpur

Uttarakhand 
Jawahar Navodaya Vidyalaya, Tarikhet
Jawahar Navodaya Vidyalaya, Rudrapur
Jawahar Navodaya Vidyalaya, Nainital
Jawahar Navodaya Vidyalaya, Haridwar
Jawahar Navodaya Vidyalaya, Champawat
Jawahar Navodaya Vidyalaya, Pithoragarh
Jawahar Navodaya Vidyalaya, Chamoli
Jawahar Navodaya Vidyalaya, Rudraprayag
Jawahar Navodaya Vidyalaya, Tehri Garhwal
Jawahar Navodaya Vidyalaya, Pauri Garhwal
Jawahar Navodaya Vidyalaya, Dehradun
Jawahar Navodaya Vidyalaya, Uttarkashi
Jawahar Navodaya Vidyalaya, Bageshwar

Patna Region 
There are a total of 85 JNVs in Patna Region. The state-wise list is follows

Bihar 
Jawahar Navodaya Vidyalaya, Muzaffarpur
Jawahar Navodaya Vidyalaya, Jamui
Jawahar Navodaya Vidyalaya, Sheikhpura
Jawahar Navodaya Vidyalaya, Buxar
Jawahar Navodaya Vidyalaya, Bihiya
Jawahar Navodaya Vidyalaya, Supaul
Jawahar Navodaya Vidyalaya, Madhubani
Jawahar Navodaya Vidyalaya, Sitamarhi
Jawahar Navodaya Vidyalaya, West Champaran
Jawahar Navodaya Vidyalaya,Birauli,Samastipur
Jawahar Navodaya Vidyalaya,Boring Road,Patna Jawahar Navodaya Vidyalaya, Shakti Nagar, Banka

Jharkhand 
Jawahar Navodaya Vidyalaya, Bokaro
Jawahar Navodaya Vidyalaya, Dhanbad
Jawahar Navodaya Vidyalaya, Koderma
Jawahar Navodaya Vidyalaya, Deoghar
Jawahar Navodaya Vidyalaya, Hazaribagh
Jawahar Navodaya Vidyalaya, Ranchi
Jawahar Navodaya Vidyalaya, Sahibganj
 Jawahar Navodaya Vidyalaya,Ghaghra Gumla
 Jawahar Navodaya Vidyalay,Senha Lohardaga

West Bengal 
Jawahar Navodaya Vidyalaya, Alipurduar
Jawahar Navodaya Vidyalaya, Bankura
Jawahar Navodaya Vidyalaya, Birbhum
Jawahar Navodaya Vidyalaya, Coochbehar
Jawahar Navodaya Vidyalaya, Hooghly
Jawahar Navodaya Vidyalaya, Durgapur
Jawahar Navodaya Vidyalaya, North 24 Parganas
Jawahar Navodaya Vidyalaya, South 24 Parganas
Jawahar Navodaya Vidyalaya, Dakshin Dinajpur
Jawahar Navodaya Vidyalaya, Uttar Dinajpur
Jawahar Navodaya Vidyalaya, Berhampur

Pune Region 
There are a total of 73 JNVs in Pune Region. The state-wise list is follows

Dadra & Nagar Haveli and Daman & Diu
Jawahar Navodaya Vidyalaya, Daman
Jawahar Navodaya Vidyalaya, Diu
 Jawahar Navodaya Vidyalaya, Silvassa

Goa 
Jawahar Navodaya Vidyalaya, Canacona
Jawahar Navodaya Vidyalaya, North Goa

Gujarat 
 Jawahar Navodaya Vidyalaya, Morbi
 Jawahar Navodaya Vidyalaya, Gandhinagar
 Jawahar Navodaya Vidyalaya, Amreli
 Jawahar Navodaya Vidyalaya, Anand
 Jawahar Navodaya Vidyalaya, Aravali
 Jawahar Navodaya Vidyalaya, Banaskantha
Jawahar Navodaya Vidyalaya, Porbandar
 Jawahar Navodaya Vidyalaya, Jamnagar
 Jawahar Navodaya Vidyalaya, Patan
Jawahar Navodaya Vidyalaya, Kutch
 Jawahar Navodaya Vidyalaya, Rajkot
Jawahar Navodaya Vidyalaya, Surendranagar
 Jawahar Navodaya Vidyalaya, Borakhadi, Tapi
Jawahar Navodaya Vidyalaya, Junagadh
Jawahar Navodaya Vidyalaya,Mahisagar

Maharashtra 

 Jawahar Navodaya Vidyalaya, Kagal, kolhapur
Jawahar Navodaya Vidyalaya, Aurangabad
Jawahar Navodaya Vidyalaya, Ahmednagar
Jawahar Navodaya Vidyalaya, Nashik
Jawahar Navodaya Vidyalaya, Palghar
Jawahar Navodaya Vidyalaya, Tuljapur, Osmanabad
Jawahar Navodaya Vidyalaya, Buldhana
Jawahar Navodaya Vidyalaya, Satara
Jawahar Navodaya Vidyalaya, Bhusawal
Jawahar Navodaya Vidyalaya, Yavatmal
Jawahar Navodaya Vidyalaya, Amravati
Jawahar Navodaya Vidyalaya, Wardha
Jawahar Navodaya Vidyalaya, Partur, Jalna
Jawahar Navodaya Vidyalaya, Washim
Jawahar Navodaya Vidyalaya, Akola
Jawahar Navodaya Vidyalaya, Parbhani

Shillong Region 
There are a total of 100 JNVs in Shillong Region. The state-wise list is follows

Arunachal Pradesh 
Jawahar Navodaya Vidyalaya, Megdong

Assam 
Jawahar Navodaya Vidyalaya, Dibrugarh
Jawahar Navodaya Vidyalaya, Karimganj
Jawahar Navodaya Vidyalaya, Golaghat
Jawahar Navodaya Vidyalaya, Bongaigaon
Jawahar Navodaya Vidyalaya, Jorhat
Jawahar Navodaya Vidyalaya, Pailapool
Jawahar Navodaya Vidyalaya, Sonitpur
Jawahar Navodaya Vidyalaya, Udalguri
Jawahar Navodaya Vidyalaya, Baksa
Jawahar Navodaya Vidyalaya, Darrang
Jawahar Navodaya Vidyalaya, Nalbari
Jawahar Navodaya Vidyalaya, Nagaon
Jawahar Navodaya Vidyalaya, Dhemaji
Jawahar Navodaya Vidyalaya, Goalpara
Jawahar Navodaya Vidyalaya, Diphu
Jawahar Navodaya Vidyalaya, Dima Hasao
Jawahar Navodaya Vidyalaya, Kokrakhar
Jawahar Navodaya Vidyalaya, Sivasagar
Jawahar Navodaya Vidyalaya, Morigoan
Jawahar Navodaya Vidyalaya, Karbi Anglong
Jawahar Navodaya Vidyalaya, West Karbi Anglong
Jawahar Navodaya Vidyalaya, Chachar
Jawahar Navodaya Vidyalaya, Chirang
Jawahar Navodaya Vidyalaya, Hailakhandi
Jawahar Navodaya Vidyalaya, Lakhimpur

Manipur 
Jawahar Navodaya Vidyalaya, Pfukhro Mao
Jawahar Navodaya Vidyalaya,Yaralpat

Meghalaya 
Jawahar Navodaya Vidyalaya, South Garo Hills
 Jawahar Navodaya Vidyalaya, East Jaintia Hills

Mizoram 
Jawahar Navodaya Vidyalaya, Champhai

Nagaland 
Jawahar Navodaya Vidyalaya, Mokokchung
Jawahar Navodaya Vidyalaya, Phek
Jawahar Navodaya Vidyalaya, Mon
Jawahar Navodaya Vidyalaya, Kiphire
Jawahar Navodaya Vidyalaya, Dimapur

Sikkim 
Jawahar Navodaya Vidyalaya, East Sikkim
Jawahar Navodaya Vidyalaya, West Sikkim
Jawahar Navodaya Vidyalaya, North Sikkim
Jawahar Navodaya Vidyalaya, South Sikkim

Tripura 
Jawahar Navodaya Vidyalaya, Dhalai
Jawahar Navodaya Vidyalaya, Dharmanagar
Jawahar Navodaya Vidyalaya, Gomati
Jawahar Navodaya Vidyalaya, North Tripura
Jawahar Navodaya Vidyalaya, Ramachandraghat
Jawahar Navodaya Vidyalaya, Khowai
Jawahar Navodaya Vidyalaya, Belonia South Tripura

References 

List
Jawahar Navodaya Vidyalayas